Craig Whittaker (born 30 August 1962) is a British politician who served as Government Deputy Chief Whip and Treasurer of the Household from September to October 2022. A member of the Conservative Party, he previously served as a Lord Commissioner of the Treasury from January 2018 to April 2019 and again from July to September 2022. Whittaker was first elected as the Member of Parliament (MP) for Calder Valley in 2010. He retained the seat in the 2015, 2017 and 2019 general elections.

Whittaker served as the Parliamentary Private Secretary (PPS) to Karen Bradley, the Secretary of State for Culture, Media and Sport. He was appointed in the reshuffle of January 2018 as HM Lord Commissioner of the Treasury in the Government Whips Office, serving until April 2019 when he was appointed Vice-Chamberlain of the Household. Prior to his role at the Treasury, he served as an Assistant Whip. Whittaker was appointed to that role in June 2017 following the snap general election.

Early life and career
Born in 1962 in Radcliffe, Lancashire, Whittaker emigrated to Australia at the age of five with his parents. In 1984, he returned to England and settled in Yorkshire. He was a Retail General Manager for a high street retailer and was involved in Retail Management from leaving high school in Australia, after completing his Higher School Certificate. He was the Branch Manager at Wilkinson for six years and then became the Retail General Manager for PC World for an eleven-year period until 2009. During his time living in Heptonstall, a village in the borough, he served on the Parish Council from 1998 to 2003.

In 2003, Whittaker was elected to Calderdale Council for the Brighouse Ward, gaining the seat from the Labour Party. He stood down from the Council at the 2004 local elections. In 2007, he was once again elected to Calderdale Council, this time for the neighbouring ward of Rastrick, securing 1,336 votes for the Conservatives and increasing the Party's majority. During this period, Whittaker served as the Cabinet Member for Children & Young People. Whittaker is a former Chair of the Calder Valley Conservatives and a former Conservative Party agent who managed the unsuccessful 2005 general election campaign of Liz Truss, then the Conservative parliamentary candidate for Calder Valley.

Parliamentary career
Whittaker was selected to be the Conservative Party's candidate for Calder Valley in March 2007. In the May 2010 general election, he was elected as the MP for constituency being the first Conservative to represent the seat since before the 1997 general election, securing a 3.6% increase in the Conservative vote and polling 20, 397 votes.

Whittaker served on the Education Select Committee in the 2010–2015 Parliament. He set up a charity, Together for Looked after Children, to support the life chances of children in care in Calderdale, which he discussed in his maiden speech in Parliament in 2010. During his time on the committee, he spoke out against the Government on occasion and criticised policy in relation to transferring responsibility for careers advice to schools, describing it as a "bit of a pigs ear". He also served as chair for the Parliamentary group for children in care.

In May 2012, he argued against legalising same sex-marriage on the basis it could lead to successive governments supporting polygamy or "three way marriages".

In the run up to the 2015 general election, Whittaker was criticised for sharing, via a tweet,  a Daily Mail newspaper column by Richard Littlejohn headlined "Vote Labour? I'd rather trust Jimmy Savile to babysit".

Following his re-election in 2015, he was appointed as Parliamentary Private Secretary (PPS) to the Immigration Minister, James Brokenshire MP. He was subsequently appointed as PPS to the Secretary of State for Culture, Media and Sport, Karen Bradley. He was appointed as Assistant Whip in June 2017 following the General Election.

Whittaker was one of 79 Conservative MPs who supported a 2011 rebel motion calling for a referendum on the EU. He also joined a 2013 rebel amendment expressing regret at not including the referendum in the government's plans. Whittaker subsequently backed the government's plans to hold a referendum, and supported Remain during the 2016 EU membership referendum. Following the referendum he said he supported the result and the government's position on triggering Article 50.

In October 2019, Whittaker was among 11 West Yorkshire MPs to urge the government go ahead with the Leeds branch of the HS2 railway.

In July 2020, Whittaker said that BAME people in the United Kingdom were responsible for increases in COVID-19 cases and that they were failing to exercise precaution, stating in a radio interview with LBC that: "If you look at the areas where we've seen rises and cases, the vast majority – but not by any stretch of the imagination all areas – it is the BAME communities that are not taking this seriously enough". He pointed to Muslim, immigrant and Asian communities particularly in West Yorkshire. The Muslim Council of Britain criticised Whittaker's claims.

Whittaker was appointed as deputy chief whip, serving under chief whip Wendy Morton, on 7 September 2022, after Liz Truss became Prime Minister. During the October government crisis, Whittaker and Morton were thought to have resigned after a contentious vote on fracking plunged the government into further turmoil. Morton and Whittaker, in the event, were not replaced by Truss and stayed in their posts until after Truss's own resignation less than 48 hours later. After Rishi Sunak became prime minister, Whittaker was replaced as deputy chief whip on 27 October 2022 by Marcus Jones.

On 22 February 2023, he was appointed as a member of the Privy Council.

Personal life
Whittaker is a member of the Church of Jesus Christ of Latter-day Saints and lives with his wife, businesswoman Elaine Wilkinson, in Rastrick. The couple married in the Chapel of St Mary Undercroft at the Palace of Westminster in August 2011. His daughter Sophie is a Conservative councillor for Rastrick ward on Calderdale council. In June 2015, Craig Whittaker reported employing his daughter as a part-time Constituency Support Officer on a salary just under £20,000. He then promoted Sophie to a full-time position as Executive Office Manager, reporting this in July 2019. In 2012 he was arrested for an alleged assault on his 24-year-old son outside a petrol station. The Crown Prosecution Service later said there were no grounds for further action.

References

External links 

Official site

Electoral history and profile at The Guardian
Profile at BBC News Democracy Live

1962 births
Living people
People from Bury, Greater Manchester
English expatriates in Australia
English businesspeople
English Latter Day Saints
Councillors in Calderdale
UK MPs 2010–2015
UK MPs 2015–2017
UK MPs 2017–2019
UK MPs 2019–present
Conservative Party (UK) MPs for English constituencies
Members of the Privy Council of the United Kingdom